Joubert Rock is a rock with a least depth of , lying  southwest of Pod Rocks and  west-southwest of Millerand Island, in Marguerite Bay, Antarctica. It was charted by the Hydrographic Survey Unit from RRS John Biscoe in 1966, and was named for Arthur B.D. Joubert, third officer of the John Biscoe and officer of the watch when the rock was discovered.

References

Rock formations of Graham Land
Fallières Coast